Faustus, Abibus and Dionysius of Alexandria (died 250) were Christian martyrs put to death under Decius in 250.

Faustus was a priest, Abibus was a deacon, and Dionysius was a lector. They were executed with several others, who include:
Andronicus, a soldier
Andropelagia,
Cyriacus, an acolyte
another Cyriacus,
Theocistus, a sea captain
Macarius,
Andreas,
Sarpambo,
Thecla, and
Caldote.
The Roman Martyrology lists only 
Faustus and Macarius with 10 companions. Their feast day is celebrated on 6 September.

References
Holweck, F. G. A Biographical Dictionary of the Saints. St. Louis, MO: B. Herder Book Co. 1924.

250 deaths
Saints from Roman Egypt
Saints trios
3rd-century Christian martyrs